Qulluta (Quechua for mortar, also spelled Jollota) is a  mountain in the Andes of Peru high. It is situated in the Huancavelica Region, Huaytará Province,  Pilpichaca District. Qulluta lies west of the Pukamayu ("red river"), a right affluent of the Pampas River.

References

Mountains of Peru
Mountains of Huancavelica Region